The 1975 Birmingham International was a men's tennis tournament played on indoor carpet courts at the Birmingham Municipal Auditorium in Birmingham, Alabama, in the United States that was part of the 1975 USLTA Indoor Circuit. It was the third edition of the event and was held from January 20 through January 26, 1975. Top-seeded Jimmy Connors won his second consecutive singles title at the event and earned $5,000 first-prize money.

Finals

Singles
 Jimmy Connors defeated  Billy Martin 6–4, 6–3
 It was Connors' 2nd singles title of the year and the 34th of his career.

Doubles
 Jürgen Fassbender /  Karl Meiler defeated  Colin Dowdeswell /  John Yuill 6–1, 3–6, 7–6

References

External links
 ITF tournament edition details

Birmingham International
Birmingham International
Birmingham International